Cyclosporiasis is a disease caused by infection with Cyclospora cayetanensis, a pathogenic protozoan transmitted by feces or feces-contaminated food and water. Outbreaks have been reported due to contaminated fruits and vegetables. It is not spread from person to person, but can be a hazard for travelers as a cause of diarrhea.

Cause
Cyclosporiasis primarily affects humans and other primates. When an oocyst of Cyclospora cayetanensis enters the small intestine, it invades the mucosa, where it incubates for about one week. After incubation, the infected person begins to experience severe watery diarrhea, bloating, fever, stomach cramps, and muscle aches.

The parasite particularly affects the jejunum of the small intestine. Of nine patients in Nepal who were diagnosed with cyclosporiasis, all had inflammation of the lamina propria along with an increase of plasma in the lamina propria. Oocysts were also observed in duodenal aspirates.

Oocysts are often present in the environment as a result of using contaminated water or human feces as fertilizer.

Diagnosis
Diagnosis can be difficult due to the lack of recognizable oocysts in the feces. PCR-based DNA tests and acid-fast staining can help with identification.

Prevention
There is no vaccine to prevent cyclosporiasis in humans at present, but one is available for reduction of fetal losses in sheep.

Treatment
The infection is often treated with trimethoprim/sulfamethoxazole, also known as Bactrim or co-trimoxazole, because traditional anti-protozoal drugs are not sufficient. To prevent transmission, food should be cooked thoroughly and drinking water from streams should be avoided.

Epidemiology
The first recorded cases of cyclosporiasis in humans were as recent as 1977, 1978, and 1979. They were reported by Ashford, a British parasitologist who discovered three cases while working in Papua New Guinea. Ashford found that the parasite had very late sporulation, from 8–11 days, making the illness difficult to diagnose. When examining feces, the unsporulated oocysts can easily be mistaken for fungal spores, and thus can be easily overlooked.

In 2007, Indian researchers published a case report that found an association between Cyclospora infection and Bell's palsy. This was the first reported case of Bell’s palsy following chronic Cyclospora infection. In addition to other extra-intestinal reports, cyclosporiasis might be involved in either reversible neuronal damage or other unknown mechanisms to lead to Guillain-Barré syndrome or Bell's palsy.

In 2010, a report of Cyclospora transmission via swimming in the Kathmandu Valley was published in the Journal of Institute of Medicine. The researchers found that openly defecated human stool samples around the swimmer's living quarters and near the swimming pool were positive for Cyclospora. However, they did not find the parasite in dog stool, bird stool, cattle dung, vegetable samples, or water samples. They concluded that pool water contaminated via environmental pollution might have caused the infection, as the parasite can resist chlorination in water.

Cyclosporiasis infections have been well reported in Nepal. In one study, Tirth Raj Ghimire, Purna Nath Mishra, and Jeevan Bahadur Sherchan collected samples of vegetables, sewage, and water from ponds, rivers, wells, and municipal taps in the Kathmandu Valley from 2002 to 2004. They found Cyclospora in radish, cauliflower, cabbage, and mustard leaves, as well as sewage and river water. This first epidemiological study determined the seasonal character of cyclosporiasis outbreaks in Nepal  during the rainy season, from May to September.

Cyclosporiasis in AIDS patients 
At the beginning of the AIDS epidemic in the early 1980s, cyclosporiasis was identified as one of the most important opportunistic infections among AIDS patients.

In 2005, Ghimire and Mishra reported a case of cyclosporiasis in a patient with low hemoglobin and suggested that this coccidian might be involved in reducing hemoglobin due to lack of immune system.  In 2006, their groups published a paper about the role of cyclosporiasis in HIV/AIDS patients and non-HIV/AIDS patients in the Kathmandu Valley.

In 2008, Indian researchers published a report about the epidemiology of Cyclospora in HIV/AIDS patients in Kathmandu. They examined samples of soil, river water, sewage, chicken stool, dog stool, and stool in the streets, and found them positive for Cyclospora. They also evaluated several risk factors for cyclosporiasis in AIDS patients.

Outbreaks 
Although it was initially thought that Cyclospora was confined to tropical and subtropical regions, occurrences of cyclosporiasis are becoming more frequent in North America. According to the Centers for Disease Control and Prevention, there have been 11 documented cyclosporiasis outbreaks in the U.S. and Canada since the 1990s. The CDC also recorded 1,110 laboratory-confirmed sporadic instances of cyclosporiasis.

Between June and August 2013, multiple independent outbreaks of the disease in the U.S. sickened at least 631 people across 25 states. Investigations later identified a bagged salad mixture as the cause of an outbreak in Iowa and Nebraska.

In 2015, the CDC was notified of 546 persons with confirmed cyclosporiasis infection across 31 states. Cluster investigations in Texas, where the greatest number of infections was reported, indicated that contaminated cilantro was the culprit.

During July 21–August 8, 2017, the Texas Department of State Health Services (DSHS) was notified of 20 cases of cyclosporiasis among persons who dined at a Mediterranean-style restaurant chain (chain A) in the Houston area.

On July 31, 2018, the United States Department of Agriculture (USDA) issued a public health alert for certain beef, pork and poultry salad and wrap products potentially contaminated with Cyclospora.
The contamination came from the chopped romaine lettuce used in these products.

In June 2020, the CDC and other regulatory bodies began investigating an outbreak of Cyclosporiasis in the Midwestern United States linked to bagged salad mix. On June 27, 2020, Fresh Express announced a voluntary recall of over 91 Fresh Express and private label salad products.

References

External links 

 Cyclosporiasis at Centers for Disease Control & Prevention
 Cyclospora Infection at MayoClinic.com

Protozoal diseases